Mazus surculosus, commonly known as suckering mazus, is a species of herbaceous perennial groundcover native to Bhutan, China, India, and Nepal.

Description
It spreads rapidly via stolons which root at the nodes. The smooth seeds are stored within an ovoid capsule.

Habitat
This species is found at high altitudes within the Himalayas mountain range. It is found between altitudes of 2000–3000 metres. It is often found in grassy areas nearby forests.

References

surculosus
Garden plants of Asia
Groundcovers